Double Glacier Volcano is an extinct volcano poking up in Double Glacier. It was discovered about 1992. It is just north of Redoubt Volcano and between Redoubt and Mount Spurr in the Aleutian Range. 

Double Glacier Volcano lava dome complex of Pleistocene age forms a nunatak in Double Glacier. K–Ar dating of the complex indicates that it formed 627,000 to 887,000 years ago.

References

Extinct volcanoes
Volcanoes of Kenai Peninsula Borough, Alaska